Telenyem Renner Ikuru (born 24 February 1966), commonly known as Tele Ikuru, is a Nigerian engineer and politician. He was first elected Deputy Governor of Rivers State in 2007 on a PDP ticket with Gov. Celestine Omehia. After the court annulled Omehia's election that year, he was picked to serve under Chibuike Amaechi and was reelected to the office in 2011.

Ikuru was among state officials who joined the All Progressive Congress with Gov. Amaechi in 2013. He later defected back to the People's Democratic Party on 22 March 2015.

Early life and education
Tele Ikuru was born and raised in Port Harcourt, Rivers State. His family roots are originally from Ikuru town Andoni. In 1992, he earned a Bachelor of Technology (B. Tech.) degree in mechanical engineering from the Rivers State University of Science and Technology.

Career
Tele Ikuru was a Principal Technical Assistant at the Shiroro Hydroelectric Power Station during his National Youth Service Corps (NYSC) programme. After completing his service (which lasted a year), Ikuru worked for various investment and construction companies, then taught at Kenneth Commercial School and Allenco Comprehensive Secondary School. He also worked at the Logos Community Bank in Port Harcourt. In 1996, he got a job with the Shell Petroleum Development Company, where he worked as an Oil/Chemical Spill Clean-Up Supervisor until 1999.

Tele Ikuru served as Commissioner of Agriculture and Natural Resources from 1999 to 2003. He was moved to Housing and Urban Development as pioneer Commissioner from 2004–06. In 2007, Ikuru ran for, and was elected Deputy Governor alongside gubernatorial candidate Celestine Omehia. After their election was annulled that year, he was adopted and served two terms in office under Governor Chibuike Amaechi.

Personal life
Tele Ikuru is married to Dr Mina Ikuru, a pediatrician, and they have four children.

Honors and awards
Ikuru has received several awards and honors, which include:

Fellow, Institute of Corporate Executives of Nigeria (FICEN).
Fellow, Nigerian Institute of Mechanical Engineers (FNIMechE).
Fellow, Nigerian Society of Engineers (FNSE).
Member, Council for the Regulation of Engineering in Nigeria (COREN).
Member, American Society of Mechanical Engineers (ASME).

See also
List of people from Rivers State
Deputy Governor of Rivers State

References

External links

  

1966 births
Living people
Rivers State Peoples Democratic Party politicians
Deputy Governors of Rivers State
Engineers from Rivers State
Rivers State Commissioners of Agriculture
Politicians from Port Harcourt
Rivers State University alumni
Nigerian mechanical engineers
Fellows of the American Society of Mechanical Engineers
Commissioners of ministries of Rivers State
Housing ministers